Daniel Chima Chukwu (born 4 April 1991) is a Nigerian professional footballer who plays as a striker for Indian Super League club Jamshedpur.

Career

Early career
Chima started playing football for Festac Sport, before going on loan to Bussdor United.

He joined the Norwegian First Division side Lyn at the beginning of the 2010-season, and scored his first goal in his debut against Bodø/Glimt on 5 April 2010.

Molde
Following the bankruptcy of Lyn, Chima joined Tippeligaen side Molde on 28 July 2010.

2011 season
On 25 April 2011, he secured a 3–1 win against Brann with a stoppage-time goal, which was also his first goal for Molde. He played 24 games and scored five goals in the 2011 Tippeligaen and contributed to Molde's first ever league championship.

2012 season
On 4 August 2012, Chukwu scored the winning goal which gave champions Molde FK victory over Sogndal in the Tippeligaen. On 30 September 2012, he fired a treble against Stabaek in a 4–3 victory to shoot Norwegian champions Molde back to the top of the table. Chima was the hero of his club as he sealed victory in a 2–0 win over Stuttgart in the Europa League on 4 October 2012. On 8 November 2012, he got on the score sheet, but ended up on the losing side as Steaua București completed a two way win in a Europa League group clash. Chima scored the only goal in Molde's 1–0 home victory against Hønefoss on 11 November 2012, which coupled with their title challengers, Strømsgodset, 2–1 defeat away to Sandnes Ulf, secured Molde's second Tippeligaen title. In December 2012, reports surfaced that Chima was wanted by Romanian club Steaua București, who were weighing up a bid. His agent Atta Aneke confirmed to Aftenposten that Steaua had shown interest in signing him in the winter of 2012.

Shanghai Shenxin
On 29 January 2015, Molde agreed to sell Chima to Shanghai Shenxin.

Legia Warsaw
On 5 January 2017, he signed a contract with Polish side Legia Warsaw. He played a total of nine games for the club before returning to Molde.

Return to Molde
On 14 February 2018, he once again signed a contract with Molde FK for an undisclosed fee. He scored six goals in 17 games in the 2018 season. On 18 February 2019, Chima Chukwu joined chinese club Heilongjiang Lava Spring on loan until the end of the 2019 season.

Taizhou Yuanda
In February 2020, Chima Chukwu moved to Chinese club Taizhou Yuanda where he signed a two-year contract.

East Bengal
On 16 September 2021, Chukwu signed with Indian Super League side SC East Bengal on a one-year deal. He scored a brace on 30 November against Odisha FC, but lost the match by 6–4.

Career statistics

Club

Honours 

Molde
 Tippeligaen: 2011, 2012, 2014
 Norwegian Cup: 2013, 2014

Jamshedpur
 Indian Super League; League Winners Shield: 2021–22

Individual
 Molde top scorer: 2013

References

External links
 
 

Sportspeople from Kano State
1991 births
Living people
Nigerian footballers
Lyn Fotball players
Molde FK players
Legia Warsaw players
Norwegian First Division players
Eliteserien players
Ekstraklasa players
Nigerian expatriate footballers
Expatriate footballers in Norway
Nigerian expatriate sportspeople in Norway
Expatriate footballers in China
Expatriate footballers in Poland
Nigerian expatriate sportspeople in Poland
Shanghai Shenxin F.C. players
Heilongjiang Ice City F.C. players
Taizhou Yuanda F.C. players
Chinese Super League players
China League One players
Association football forwards
Bussdor United F.C. players
East Bengal Club players
Jamshedpur FC players